Susann Schützel (born 21 May 1978) is a blind retired German Paralympic judoka who competed in international level events. She was a judo champion at the 2004 Summer Paralympics in Athens.

References

1978 births
Living people
Sportspeople from Berlin
Sportspeople from Frankfurt
Paralympic judoka of Germany
Judoka at the 2004 Summer Paralympics
Medalists at the 2004 Summer Paralympics
German female judoka
21st-century German women